Streptomyces novaecaesareae is a bacterium species from the genus of Streptomyces which has been isolated from soil in the United States.

See also 
 List of Streptomyces species

References

Further reading

External links
Type strain of Streptomyces novaecaesareae at BacDive -  the Bacterial Diversity Metadatabase	

novaecaesareae
Bacteria described in 1948